Daniël 'Dany' Verlinden (born 15 August 1963) is a Belgian retired professional footballer who played as a goalkeeper.

Often referred to as De Muur ("the wall"), he spent most of his career at Club Brugge, having played into his 40s. Dany is the father of Thibaud Verlinden, he is playing at FC DAC 1904

Club career
Verlinden was born in Aarschot, Flemish Brabant. Having arrived at Club Brugge K.V. from Lierse S.K. in 1988, he gained first-choice status in his second year and, except for one season, never lost it again. He ranked the second most-capped player for the club in the Belgian Pro League, trailing only Franky Van der Elst, and was instrumental in the side's five league conquests (with the addition of as many cups and nine supercups).

In December 2003, Verlinden became the oldest footballer ever to play in the UEFA Champions League, aged 40 years and 116 days. Alessandro Costacurta of A.C. Milan took over the record on 21 November 2006, when the [Italian played in a 1–0 group stage away defeat against AEK Athens aged 40 years and 211 days. Verlinden, however, held the European record for longest time spent in goal without conceding, managing to keep a clean sheet a total of 1,390 minutes in the Belgian league between 3 March and 26 September 1990.

International career
Verlinden played once for Belgium, and was called up for the squad at the 1994 and 1998 FIFA World Cups. His sole cap was obtained on 25 March 1998, as he played the full 90 minutes in a 2–2 friendly home draw to Norway.

Coaching career
After his playing career Verlinden remained with Club Brugge, as a goalkeeping coach, until his unceremonious dismissal in 2012.

From the season 2018–19 on he was the goalkeeper coach of Cercle Brugge.

Honours
Club Brugge

 Belgian First Division: 1989–90, 1991–92, 1995–96, 1997–98, 2002–03
 Belgian Cup: 1990–91, 1994–95, 1995–96, 2001–02, 2003–04
 Belgian Supercup: 1988, 1990, 1991, 1992, 1994, 1996, 1998
 Bruges Matins: 1990, 1992, 1993, 1995, 1996, 1998, 2000, 2001
 Amsterdam Tournament: 1990
 Jules Pappaert Cup: 1991, 1995

Individual
 Belgian Professional Goalkeeper of the Year: 1992–93, 2002–03

References

External links
 
 
 
 
 

1963 births
Living people
People from Aarschot
Belgian footballers
Association football goalkeepers
Belgian Pro League players
Challenger Pro League players
Lierse S.K. players
Club Brugge KV players
Belgium international footballers
1994 FIFA World Cup players
1998 FIFA World Cup players
Footballers from Flemish Brabant